Pierre-Raymond Villemiane (Pineuil, 12 March 1951) was a French professional road bicycle racer. During his professional career, Villemiane won three stages in the Tour de France.

Major results

1973
Lubersac
1975
Prueba Villafranca de Ordizia
1976
Pfäffikon - Feusiberg
1977
Oradour-sur-Glane
Tour de France:
Winner Intermediate sprints classification
Winner stage 1
1978
Bayon
Beaulac-Bernos
GP Ouest-France
Parizot
Tour du Tarn
1979
Josselin
Tour de France:
Winner stage 13
1980
GP des Herbiers
 National Road Race Champion
Paris–Camembert
Castillon-la-Bataille
1981
Camors
Chateauroux - Limoges
1982
Chanteloup
GP Monaco
Trophée des Grimpeurs
Vailly-sur-Sauldre
Tour de France:
Winner stage 10

External links 

Official Tour de France results for Pierre-Raymond Villemiane

French male cyclists
1951 births
Living people
French Tour de France stage winners
Sportspeople from Gironde
Cyclists from Nouvelle-Aquitaine
20th-century French people
21st-century French people